Melvin Emery Patton (November 16, 1924 – May 9, 2014) was an American sprinter, who set the world record in the 100 yard dash of 9.2 seconds in 1948. He also set a 220 yd world record in 1949 on a straightaway of 20.2, breaking the record held by Jesse Owens.

Patton won two gold medals at the 1948 Summer Olympics. He was ranked first in the world in the 100 m and 200 m events in 1947 and 1949.

Biography
Born in Los Angeles, California, Mel Patton or Pell Mell, as he was nicknamed in the late 1940s, made his mark in track and field while a student at the University of Southern California, where he was coached by Dean Cromwell. During his collegiate years, Patton was a member of the Delta-Eta Chapter of the Kappa Sigma Fraternity. He also attended University High School in Los Angeles.

Patton won the NCAA 100-yard dash in 1947 and in 1948 and 1949 completed the 100 and 220 yd sprint double at that same meet. In 1947 he tied the 100 yd dash world record of 9.4, which he lowered it 9.3 the following year. In 1949 he set a 220 yd world record on a straightaway of 20.2, breaking the record held by Jesse Owens.

In the Olympic Trials, he suffered a rare loss to Barney Ewell in the 100 m final, then in the Olympic Games placed only fifth in the 100 m. He atoned for that disappointment by taking two gold medals in the 200 m and the 4 × 100 m relay.

After retiring from competition, Patton participated in several professional races in Australia. Then he worked as a teacher and athletics coach at Long Beach City College and Wichita State University before becoming an executive in the aerospace and electronics industries. Previously he served in the U.S. Navy as a seaman and aviator during World War II. In the 1970s Patton helped develop the national sports program in Saudi Arabia. He was inducted into the National Track and Field Hall of Fame in 1985, and died in Fallbrook, California on May 9, 2014. He was married to Shirley and had a daughter Susan and a son named Gary.

Competition record

References

External links

An Olympian’s Oral History – Melvin Patton

1924 births
2014 deaths
American male sprinters
Athletes (track and field) at the 1948 Summer Olympics
Medalists at the 1948 Summer Olympics
Olympic gold medalists for the United States in track and field
USC Trojans men's track and field athletes
University High School (Los Angeles) alumni
Track and field athletes from Los Angeles
United States Navy pilots of World War II
United States Navy personnel of World War II